A hype man, in hip hop music and rapping, is a backup rapper and/or singer who supports the primary rappers with exclamations and interjections and who attempts to increase the audience's excitement.

Origins
Early hype men included MC Cowboy and Creole of Grandmaster Flash and the Furious Five. Kool Moe Dee calls Creole "the original hype man".

Public Enemy's hype man Flavor Flav, who established many of the conventions of the craft, such as an outlandish style (for example, by wearing large clocks around his neck) and a vocal style that contrasted dramatically with that of the MC (his rasping high voice was a counterpoint to Chuck D's booming baritone).

Techniques 

Of the hype man will use call-and-response chants, in order to excite the crowd. Often the hype man will ask the crowd "Throw your hands in the air" and "Everybody say ho!" Which are phrases coined by Mc Cowboy.

The hype man's interjections are also planned to give the MC an opportunity to breathe, and give the illusion of an unbroken flow. Music writer Mickey Hess expands the term as follows: "a hype man is a figure who plays a central but supporting role within a group, making his own interventions, generally aimed at hyping up the crowd while also drawing attention to the words of the MC".

Rapper Royce da 5'9" describes how a hype man can contribute to a live performance: "a lot of my verses [can] be so constant with the flow [that] I'd need somebody to help me." Lateef the Truthspeaker has stated, "You're gonna have to have somebody say something somewhere to give you a breath... usually it's just a matter of getting somebody to hit some line or some word in a line—that's all you really need."

Hype man who became lead rappers and producers 
Prior to becoming a lead rapper himself, Jay-Z began his career as a hype man for Jaz-O and was later the hype man for Big Daddy Kane.

Icons of Hip Hop also notes that some producers, such as Diddy, Lil Jon, Swizz Beatz, and Jermaine Dupri, "have transitioned from a hype man role to become rappers and stars in their own right".

Hype man in rock and pop music 
Occasionally pop or rock groups include a member up front alongside the lead singer who may perform backup vocals or percussion but largely functions to excite the audience through dancing and/or stage patter. Examples include Bob Nastanovich for Pavement, Bez of The Happy Mondays and Guy Picciotto in Fugazi's earliest incarnation.

Partial list of hype men
Danny Boy O'Connor for House of Pain

Diddy for The Notorious B.I.G.

Flavor Flav for Public Enemy

Freaky Tah of the Lost Boyz 

Jay-Z for or Jaz-O and Big Daddy Kane

Joe C. for Kid Rock

Memphis Bleek for Jay-Z

Proof and Mr. Porter of D12 for Eminem

References

Hip hop
Hip hop terminology